Cristian Gordillo (born February 22, 1990) is a Mexican professional footballer who currently plays for Los Angeles Force in the National Independent Soccer Association.

Career
On August 8, 2019, California United Strikers FC signed Gordillo prior to their first season in the National Independent Soccer Association. Prior to this he played for the Strikers' United Premier Soccer League side, California United FC II, between Spring 2018 and Spring 2019. In February 2019, Gordillo and the team won the UPSL Fall Season National Championship over Inocentes FC.

In November 2019, UPSL side Orange County FC 2 announced they had signed Gordillo.

References

External links
 
Cristian Gordillo at Ascenso MX

Living people
1990 births
Mexican footballers
Atlético Morelia players
C.F. Mérida footballers
Toros Neza footballers
Bravos de Nuevo Laredo footballers
Atlético Reynosa footballers
Atlético San Luis footballers
Club Necaxa footballers
Club Celaya footballers
FC Juárez footballers
Los Angeles Force players
Liga MX players
Ascenso MX players
Liga Premier de México players
Tercera División de México players
National Independent Soccer Association players
Footballers from Mexico City
Association football forwards